La Voix de l'Est may refer to:

La Voix de l'Est (Bagnolet), a French Communist Party local weekly newspaper published from Bagnolet, France
La Voix de l'Est (Granby), a French language daily in Granby, Quebec